The First Tarlev Cabinet was the Cabinet of Moldova from 19 April 2001 to 19 April 2005. It was the first government led by Vasile Tarlev who was the Prime Minister of Moldova from 2001 to 2008.

Cabinet of Ministers 

The composition of the cabinet was as follows:

Prime Minister
Vasile Tarlev (19 April 2001 - 19 April 2005)

First Deputy Prime Minister
Vasilie Iovv (31 January 2002 - 19 April 2005)

Deputy Prime Minister
Valerian Cristea (19 April 2001 - 19 April 2005)

Deputy Prime Minister, Minister of Agriculture and Food Industry
Dmitri Todoroglo (19 April 2001 - 19 April 2005)

Deputy Prime Minister, Minister of Economy
Andrei Cucu (19 April 2001 - 4 February 2002)
Ștefan Odagiu (16 May 2002 - 2 July 2003)
Marian Lupu (5 August 2003 - 24 March 2005)

Deputy Prime Minister
Andrei Stratan (21 December 2004 - 19 April 2005)

Minister of Foreign Affairs
Nicolae Cernomaz (19 April 2001 - 27 July 2001)
Iurie Leancă (27 July - 3 September 2001) - interim
Nicolae Dudău (3 September 2001 - 4 February 2004)
Andrei Stratan (4 February 2004 - 19 April 2005)

Minister of Finance
Mihail Manoli (19 April 2001 - 7 February 2002)
Zinaida Greceanîi (26 February 2002 - 19 April 2005)

Minister of Industry
Mihail Garștea (19 April 2001 - 19 April 2005)

Minister of Energy
Ion Leșanu (19 April 2001 - 27 July 2001)
Iacob Timciuc (8 August 2001 - 19 April 2005)

Minister of Environment, Public Works and Regional Development
Gheorghe Duca (19 April 2001 - 5 February 2004)

Minister of Environment and Natural Resources
Constantin Mihăilescu (19 March 2004 - 19 April 2005)

Minister of Transport and Communications
Victor Țopa (19 April 2001 - 12 December 2001)
Anatol Cupțov (12 December 2001 - 13 November 2002)
Vasile Zgardan (5 December 2002 - 19 April 2005)

Minister of Labour and Social Protection
Valerian Revenco (19 April 2001 - 19 April 2005)

Minister of Health
Andrei Gherman (19 April 2001 - 19 April 2005)

Minister of Education
Ilie Vancea (19 April 2001 - 26 February 2002)
Gheorghe Sima (26 February 2002 - 2 July 2003)
Valentin Beniuc (5 August 2003 - 19 April 2005)

Ministrer of Culture
Ion Păcuraru (19 April 2001 - 23 December 2002)
Veaceslav Madan (23 December 2002 - 19 April 2005)

Minister of the Interior
Vasile Drăgănel (19 April 2001 - 27 February 2002)
Gheorghe Papuc (27 February 2002 - 19 April 2005)

Minister of Defence
Victor Gaiciuc (19 April 2001 - 15 October 2004)
Tudor Colesniuc (15 October - 29 December 2004) - interim
Valeriu Pleșca (29 December 2004 - 19 April 2005)

Minister of Justice
Ion Morei (19 April 2001 - 12 February 2003)
Vasile Dolghieru (12 February 2003 - 8 July 2004)
Victoria Iftodi (8 July 2004 - 19 April 2005)

Minister of Reintegration
Vasile Șova (12 December 2002 - 19 April 2005)

, plus 3 ex officio members:

Governor of Gagauzia. The Başkan (Governor) of Gagauzia is elected by universal, equal, direct, secret and free suffrage on an alternative basis for a term of 4 years. One and the same person can be a governor for no more than two consecutive terms. The Başkan of Gagauzia is confirmed as a member of the Moldovan government by a decree of the President of Moldova.
Dumitru Croitor (19 April 2001 - 21 June 2002)
Gheorghe Tabunșcic (15 November 2002 - 19 April 2005)

Mayor of Chișinău
Serafim Urechean (19 April 2001 - 5 February 2002)

Head of the Academy of Sciences of Moldova
Gheorghe Duca (24 August 2004 - 19 April 2005)

References

External links 
 Government of Moldova

 

Moldova cabinets
2001 establishments in Moldova
2005 disestablishments in Moldova
Cabinets established in 2001
Cabinets disestablished in 2005